Thomas James Keinhorst (born 14 July 1990) is a German international rugby league footballer who plays as a  or  forward for Hull Kingston Rovers in the Betfred Super League.

He has previously played for the Leeds Rhinos in the Super League, and spent time on loan from Leeds at the Hunslet Hawks in the Championship, as well as the Wakefield Trinity Wildcats and the Widnes Vikings in the Super League. Keinhorst has also spent time on loan from Hull KR at the York City Knights in the Betfred Championship.

He has played rugby union for Heidelberger RK in the German Rugby-Bundesliga and in England with Otley in National League 1. He also represented Germany at international level.

Background
Keinhorst was born in Leeds, West Yorkshire, England.

Playing career
Keinhorst began playing rugby league in 2004, while attending St. Mary's Catholic High School.

Playing positions

Rugby union
He primarily played as an inside-centre, but he could also play as an outside-centre or in the second row.

Senior rugby union career

Heidelberger RK (2009-10)
Keinhorst began playing rugby union as an amateur with Otley and he later moved to Germany to play for Heidelberger RK in 2009, at the age of 19, and he won the National Championship in the 2009-10 season.

He played eight games and scored four tries in his first season.

Otley (2010-11)
Keinhorst rejoined Otley as a semi-professional in 2010, and went onto make 11 appearances in the 2010-11 season, scoring three tries before leaving at the end of the season to sign a professional contract at rugby league side the Leeds Rhinos.

Senior rugby league career

Leeds (2012-18)
Keinhorst signed for Leeds in 2011, and made his Super League début on 30 July 2012, in the defeat by the  Wakefield Trinity Wildcats.

Keinhorst came on as a substitute in Leeds' losing effort in the 2012 Challenge Cup Final defeat by Warrington at Wembley Stadium.

Keinhorst played from the interchange bench for Leeds in the 2015 Super League Grand Final, and helped to set-up the winning try for Josh Walters, in a 22-20 victory over Wigan.

Keinhorst scored a hat-trick of tries for Leeds in round 2 of the 2018 Super League season, against Hull Kingston Rovers at Elland Road.

It was revealed at the end of the 2018 campaign, that Keinhorst would be departing Leeds to sign a contract to play for Hull Kingston Rovers.

Hull Kingston Rovers (2019 - present)
In October 2018, Keinhorst signed a three-year deal with Hull Kingston Rovers.

On 9 January 2019, Keinhorst received the number 4 jersey ahead of the start of the Super League season.  On 13 January 2019, Keinhorst made his non-competitive Hull Kingston Rovers' début in a pre-season friendly against Widnes, Keinhorst claimed a 30-16 victory with his new club.

Keinhorst made his first competitive appearance for Hull Kingston Rovers in round 1 of the 2019 Super League season, Keinhorst scored a dramatic try in the final six seconds of the match on his début, going onto record a thrilling 18-16 victory over cross-city rivals Hull F.C. at Craven Park.

On 4 September 2020 it was reported that Keinhorst would resume with Hull KR after his loan period at the York City Knights.

Castleford (loan)
On 31 July 2021, it was reported that he had signed for Castleford in the Super League on a short-term loan

Representative career

Rugby union
He made his début for Germany in a match against Poland on 20 November 2010.

Keinhorst scored his first try for Germany a week later against the Netherlands in Amsterdam.

Rugby league
Keinhorst is the youngest of four rugby-playing brothers and qualifies to play for Germany through his German father Wolfgang, who has lived in the United Kingdom for many years.

Jimmy and his three brothers, Kristian, Markus and Nicholas set a world record in 2007, when they played in a rugby league international game for Germany against the Czech Republic, becoming the most siblings to play in a rugby league international match.

As of 2012, Keinhorst was the top try and point scorer for Germany.

Honours

Career awards and accolades

Rugby league

Club (Leeds Rhinos 2012-18)
 Super League (1): 2015
 League Leaders' Shield (1): 2015

Rugby union

Club (Heidelberger RK 2009-10)
 German Rugby Union Championship (1): 2009–10

References

External links

Hull KR profile
Leeds Rhinos profile
SL profile
  James Keinhorst at totalrugby.de
 James Keinhorst at the DRV website

1990 births
Living people
Castleford Tigers players
Dual-code rugby internationals
English people of German descent
English rugby union players
German rugby league players
English rugby league players
German rugby union players
York City Knights players
Germany international rugby union players
Germany national rugby league team players
Heidelberger RK players
Hull Kingston Rovers players
Hunslet R.L.F.C. players
Leeds Rhinos players
Otley R.U.F.C. players
People educated at St. Mary's Catholic High School, Menston
Rugby league centres
Rugby league five-eighths
Rugby league fullbacks
Rugby league players from Leeds
Rugby union players from Leeds
Rugby union wings
Wakefield Trinity players
Widnes Vikings players